Murmurs is the first full-length album released by Caroline. It was released on Temporary Residence Limited.

Track listing
 Bicycle  – 3:46
 Pink & Black  – 4:41
 Sunrise  – 4:02
 Where's My Love?  – 4:22
 Everylittlething  – 3:19
 All I Need  – 3:20
 Drove Me to the Wall  – 3:50
 I'll Leave My Heart Behind  – 4:22
 Winter  – 4:48

Personnel
Caroline (vocals, lyrics, arrangement, producer)
Daniel Rosenboom (trumpet)
Johnny C (clay udu drums, shakers, spirit chime, finger cymbals, sleigh bells, cabasa, caxixi on "Bicycle")
Kai Kurosawa (producer, arrangement, mixer, programmer on "Bicycle")
Andreas Bjorck (producer, arrangement, programming, mixer on "Pink & Black", "Sunrise", "Winter", "Where's My Love"; string arrangements on "Winter")
Jeffrey Lufkin (producer, programmer on "Everylittlething")
Tarik Monsanto (mixer on "Everylittlething")
Jason Greenberg (producer, programmer, arrangement, mixer on "All I Need" and "Drove Me To The Wall")
Tomoji Sogawa (producer, programmer, arrangement on "I'll Leave My Heart Behind")
Makoto Totani (guitar on "I'll Leave My Heart Behind")
Masahiko Sato (recording engineer on "I'l Leave My Heart Behind")
Wataru_Pop (mix)

Reviews 
Reviews compared soloist Caroline to Icelandic singer Bjork, as well as her vocal range (from sultry whisper to pop diva). Other aspects of the album noted were the various instrumentation in the individual songs.

References

External links
Murmurs lyrics

2006 albums
Temporary Residence Limited albums